Patrick Creadon (born May 4, 1967) is an American filmmaker primarily known for his work in documentaries.  His first film, Wordplay, profiled New York Times crossword editor Will Shortz and premiered at the 2006 Sundance Film Festival. The film screened in over 500 theatres nationwide and became the second-highest grossing documentary of that year.  His second film, I.O.U.S.A., is a non-partisan examination of America's national debt problem and forecast the global financial crisis of 2007-2008. I.O.U.S.A.  premiered at the 2008 Sundance Film Festival and was later named one of the Top 5 Documentaries of the Year by film critic Roger Ebert.

Other works include the documentary features If You Build It (2013), the ESPN 30 for 30 film Catholics vs. Convicts (2016), and  Hesburgh (2019). He also works as a commercial and television director.

Creadon is one of only a handful of filmmakers to have multiple films ranked among the Top 100 highest-grossing documentaries of all time simultaneously.  Other filmmakers who have done this include Werner Herzog and Academy Award winners Michael Moore, Errol Morris, Alex Gibney, Charles H. Ferguson, Morgan Neville, and Davis Guggenheim.

Career
Creadon and his siblings worked as child actors in Chicago.  He starred in the made-for-television special Rascals and Robbers: The Secret Adventures of Tom Sawyer and Huckleberry Finn alongside Anthony Michael Hall and Cynthia Nixon.

He began his filmmaking career in Chicago on The 90s, produced by Tom Weinberg and Joel Cohen. Creadon regularly shot and edited stories for the critically acclaimed weekly documentary showcase.  The series was presented on PBS by WTTW/Chicago and KBDI/Denver.  The Arizona Republic called The 90's "the best show on television."  At 22 years old, Creadon was one of the youngest cameramen in the history of PBS.

In 1993, he moved to Los Angeles after being accepted to the AFI Conservatory, where he earned his master's degree in cinematography.  His thesis film Tendrils (on which he served as Director of Photography) was nominated for a student Academy Award in 1997.  As a cameraman, his work has appeared on every major network, including NBC, CBS, ABC, MTV, VH1, and ESPN. He has also done work for Paramount Pictures, Warner Brothers, Sony, Universal Studios, and Disney.

Filmography

Wordplay

Creadon's documentary Wordplay was acquired for distribution for $1,000,000 by IFC Films and The Weinstein Company after being nominated for the Grand Jury Prize at Sundance 2006.  It was released theatrically on June 16, 2006.  The film ran in over 500 theaters across the United States, including at least one theater in all fifty states.  Wordplay went on to gross $3,100,000 in domestic box-office, then ranking it among the Top 25 highest grossing documentaries of all time.

A 2008 episode of The Simpsons, "Homer and Lisa Exchange Cross Words", is based on the film.  James L. Brooks got the inspiration for the episode after watching Wordplay.  "We felt both Will and Merl were very compelling, off-the-beaten-track personalities [in Wordplay], who would fit into our universe very well," Brooks said.  The episode was written by Tim Long, and directed by Nancy Kruse, and guest starred crossword puzzle creators Merl Reagle and Will Shortz as themselves.

Creadon and his wife, producer Christine O'Malley, borrowed $100,000 from family and friends to make Wordplay over the course of 2005–06.

Critical response
National Board of Review nomination "Best Documentary 2006"
Critics Choice Award nomination "Best Documentary 2006" 
Grand Jury Prize nomination at Sundance "Best American Documentary 2006" 
Rottentomatoes.com – "Golden Tomato Award For Best Reviewed Documentary of 2006"

I.O.U.S.A.

Creadon's second feature documentary I.O.U.S.A. premiered in the U.S. Documentary Competition at Sundance in January 2008, one of only sixteen films selected from over 950 submissions.  The film is a profile of former Comptroller General David M. Walker as he and others travel the country warning of financial challenges facing the country.  Also featured prominently in the film is Robert Bixby, executive director of the non-partisan Concord Coalition.  It was released by Roadside Attractions and opened theatrically on August 22, 2008.  In an innovative event that took place the night before, I.O.U.S.A. was simulcast live by National CineMedia to an audience of almost 45,000 in 350 theaters across the United States.  Warren Buffett and others took part in the live town hall meeting immediately after the screening (also simulcast).  In addition to traditional movie theaters, the film also screened on over 100 college campuses and community centers throughout the 2008 presidential campaign and after the election, including a special screening for members of Congress at the Library of Congress.

Critical response
Academy Awards Shortlist "2008 Best Documentary Feature"
Roger Ebert's "Top 5 Docs of 2008"
Critics Choice Award nomination "Best Documentary 2008"
Grand Jury Prize nomination at Sundance "Best American Documentary 2008"

In promoting the documentary, Creadon was interviewed by APM's Marketplace, CNN's Lou Dobbs, MSNBC's 1600 Pennsylvania Avenue with David Shuster, NPR's Tavis Smiley, and others.

If You Build It

A documentary film directed by Creadon and produced by Neal Baer showing a year in the life of an innovative school in Bertie County, North Carolina.  Facing a bleak economic future in the county, the Superintendent of Public Schools for Bertie, Chip Zullinger, invites Emily Pilloton and Matt Miller to create a high school shop class curriculum for the 21st century.

Personal life
Creadon was born in Riverside, Illinois and graduated from Fenwick High School in Oak Park, Illinois in 1985.  He graduated with a BA in International Relations from The University of Notre Dame in 1989, where he served as a writer and an editor for the school paper The Observer.

Creadon is married to and works with producer Christine O'Malley.  They live in Los Feliz, California, where they are raising their three daughters, Fiona, Grace, and Charlotte.

He was a member of the U.S. Documentary Jury at the 2009 Sundance Film Festival.

In 2010, Creadon spearheaded support for documentary filmmaker Joe Berlinger during his legal battles against Chevron Corporation. Chevron sued for and won the right to gain access to all the footage Berlinger had shot during production of his film Crude.  The letter, co-signed by editor Doug Blush and supported by the International Documentary Association, was signed by over 200 members of the documentary community, including over 20 Academy Award winning documentary filmmakers.  Berlinger appealed the decision and won a more positive ruling in a later hearing.

He is a founding member of the Documentary Committee at the Directors Guild of America. He currently serves as co-chair of the DGA Documentary Awards Committee.

References

External links
 
 An Interview with I.O.U.S.A. Director Patrick Creadon at Huffington Post
 Patrick Creadon Writes About His Interviewing Style and Influences at Moving Pictures Magazine
 Nickelodeon Taps Patrick Creadon and Christine O'Malley to Produce First-Ever SpongeBob SquarePants Documentary at Reuters

1967 births
Living people
American documentary filmmakers
American film directors
University of Notre Dame alumni
Writers from Chicago
People from Los Feliz, Los Angeles